Osina  is a village in Goleniów County, West Pomeranian Voivodeship, in north-western Poland. It is the seat of the gmina (administrative district) called Gmina Osina.

For the history of the region, see History of Pomerania.

The village has a population of 960.

References

Villages in Goleniów County